A by-election for the seat of Jingili in the Northern Territory Legislative Assembly was held on 15 December 1984. The by-election was triggered by the resignation of CLP Chief Minister Paul Everingham to seek election to the Federal House of Representatives. The seat of Jingili had been held by Everingham since its creation in 1974.

Results

References

1984 elections in Australia
Northern Territory by-elections